Elections were held in Illinois in 1969. These included the election of members of Illinois Constitutional Convention and special elections for a number of offices.

Election information
1969 was an off-year election.

Federal elections

Illinois's 13th congressional district special election

A special election was held to fill the remainder of the unexpired term for Illinois's 13th congressional district, which had  vacated by Republican Donald Rumsfeld when he had been appointed Director of the Office of Economic Opportunity.

Primaries were held October 7, and the general election was held November 25.

Democratic primary

Republican primary

General election

State elections

Members of the Constitutional Convention
In 1968, Illinois voters approved a call for a constitutional convention. In 1969, elections were held to elect the members of the constitutional convention by Illinois Senate district.

Primaries were held to elect members to the Illinois Constitutional Convention on September 23, and general elections were held to elect these members on November 18, 1969. The elections were nonpartisan, and primaries were only held in districts where enough candidates were running that a primary was required to be held to narrow them down for the general.

Illinois Senate 53rd district special election
A special election was held for the 53rd district seat of the Illinois Senate left vacant after Paul Simon resigned to assume the office of lieutenant governor of Illinois. Primaries were held March 11, and the general election was held April 29.

Illinois House of Representatives 33rd district special election
A special election was held 33rd district seat of the Illinois House of Representatives left vacant after the death of John "Jack" B. Hill. Primaries were held May 6, and the general election was held June 24.

Local elections
Local elections were held.

References

 
Illinois